Nanjing Forestry University(NFU or NJFU, . Chinese abbr. 南林大 or 南林) is an institution of higher learning in Nanjing, China. It is jointly run and administered by central government of Jiangsu Provincial Government. It is a Chinese state Double First Class University, included in the Double First Class University Plan identified by the Ministry of Education of China.

History 
The origin of the university can be traced back to the Forest Departments of Jinling University and Central University. In 1952, Nanjing Forestry College was established after the merger of the Forest Departments from Wuhan University, Nanchang University, and Hubei Agricultural College. It was renamed Nanjing Technological College of Forest Products in 1972. It adopted the current name in 1985.

Schools and departments 
College of Forest Resources and Environment
College of Materials Science and Engineering
College of Chemical Engineering
College of Mechanical and Electronic Engineering
College of Civil Engineering
College of Economics and Management
College of Humanities and Social Sciences
College of Information Science and Technology
College of Landscape Architecture
College of Science
College of Foreign Studies
College of Art Design
College of Furniture and Industrial Design
College of Light Industry Science and Engineering
College of Automobile and Traffic Engineering
Graduate School
College of International Education
College of Applied Technology
College of Continuing Education
Nanfang College

Key labs

Research centers

Research Institutes

Agreements For Academic Exchanges and Cooperation

International conferences 
Nanjing Forestry University has held 23 international symposia and conferences.

Publications 
Academic publications issued by NFU are Journal of Nanjing Forestry University (one edition for natural sciences and the other for humanities and social sciences), China Forestry Science and Technology, and Interior Design + Construction.

External links 

 南京林业大学
 Nanjing Forestry University

References 

1952 establishments in China
Universities and colleges in Nanjing
Forestry in China